The Spring Lake Recreation Area is a recreational facility of the Ozark-St. Francis National Forest in Yell County, Arkansas.  It is located north of Danville, in and around Spring Lake, a man-made lake constructed in 1937 with funding from the Works Progress Administration.  The area has facilities for fishing and picnicking, including many structures built with WPA funding the Rustic style common to work of the Civilian Conservation Corps.  Facilities from that period include picnic pavilions and developed picnic sites, a bathhouse, two swimming platforms, the Spring Lake Bridge, and the dam which impounds Spring Creek at the southern end of the lake.  The area was listed on the National Register of Historic Places in 1995 as the Spring Lake Recreation Area Historic District.

See also
National Register of Historic Places listings in Yell County, Arkansas

References

Historic districts on the National Register of Historic Places in Arkansas
National Register of Historic Places in Yell County, Arkansas
Buildings and structures completed in 1937
Ozark–St. Francis National Forest
Works Progress Administration in Arkansas
1937 establishments in Arkansas
Rustic architecture in Arkansas